Miles Scotson (born 18 January 1994) is an Australian track and road cycling racer, who currently rides for UCI WorldTeam . Scotson was a student at Trinity College Gawler, completing his studies in 2011. Scotson's first professional victory was the 2017 Australian National Road Race Championships. In May 2019, he was named in the startlist for the 2019 Giro d'Italia.

Scotson's younger brother Callum Scotson is also a successful professional cyclist and former Trinity student, who currently rides for UCI WorldTeam .

Major results

2012
 1st  Team pursuit, UCI Junior Track World Championships
 3rd Time trial, National Junior Road Championships
2013
 4th Time trial, Oceania Under-23 Road Championships
2014
 1st  Team pursuit, UCI Track World Championships 
 1st  Team pursuit, 2014–15 UCI Track Cycling World Cup, Guadalajara
 3rd Time trial, National Under-23 Road Championships
2015
 National Under-23 Road Championships
1st  Road race
1st  Time trial
 3rd  Team pursuit, UCI Track World Championships
 4th Chrono Champenois
 7th Time trial, UCI Under-23 Road World Championships
 8th Gran Premio di Poggiana
2016
 1st  Team pursuit, UCI Track World Championships
 1st Stage 3a (ITT) Olympia's Tour
 National Under-23 Road Championships
2nd Time trial
3rd Road race
 3rd  Time trial, UCI Under-23 Road World Championships
 4th Chrono Champenois
 5th Duo Normand (with Callum Scotson)
2017
 National Road Championships
1st  Road race
5th Time trial
 2nd  Team time trial, UCI Road World Championships
2019
 4th Overall Tour Poitou-Charentes en Nouvelle-Aquitaine
1st  Young rider classification
2021
 4th Classic Loire Atlantique
 9th Overall Volta a la Comunitat Valenciana
1st Stage 1

Grand Tour general classification results timeline

References

External links

1994 births
Living people
Australian male cyclists
Australian track cyclists
Cyclists at the 2014 Commonwealth Games
Commonwealth Games competitors for Australia
Cyclists from South Australia
20th-century Australian people
21st-century Australian people